Viktor Kamarzayev is a Soviet midfielder from Russia and Ukrainian coach.

He has a younger brother, Anatoliy Kamarzayev, who in the 1990s played football in lower Russian leagues.

External links
 Viktor Kamarayev on footballfacts.ru
 Viktor Kamarzayev stats for Metalist Kharkiv
 All coaches of Metalist Kharkiv

1956 births
Living people
People from Prokhladny, Kabardino-Balkar Republic
Russian emigrants to Ukraine
Soviet footballers
PFC Spartak Nalchik players
FC Metalist Kharkiv players
FC Metalurh Zaporizhzhia players
FC Torpedo Zaporizhzhia players
FC Vorskla Poltava players
FC Olympik Kharkiv players
FC Metalist-2 Kharkiv players
Ukrainian football managers
FC Metalist Kharkiv managers
FC Arsenal Kharkiv managers
Ukrainian Premier League managers
Association footballers not categorized by position